The final of the Women's Hammer Throw event at the 2003 Pan American Games took place on Tuesday August 5, 2003.

Medalists

Records

Results

See also
2003 World Championships in Athletics – Women's hammer throw
2003 Hammer Throw Year Ranking
Athletics at the 2004 Summer Olympics – Women's hammer throw

Notes

References
Results
hammerthrow.wz

Hammer, Women
2003
2003 in women's athletics